Landsort is a Swedish village with a lighthouse on the island of Öja. The village has around 30 permanent residents.

The tower was built in 1689, with an upper conical iron section added in 1870. Open fires, serving as beacons, have been lit at the site since early times.

Landsort is the southernmost point of the Stockholm archipelago.

Lighthouse
The first lighthouse in the modern sense was lit in 1651 and, until the current tower was raised, a couple of different buildings were used to support the light. The tower of 1689 was constructed to carry an open fire, which burned coal. In 1840, a colza oil lamp was installed. A flame consumed paraffin from 1887 but in 1938 the beacon was electrified. Today the Swedish Maritime Administration owns and runs the lighthouse.

During World War II and the Cold War, Landsort was a military base for the Swedish Coastal Artillery.

Climate
The Swedish weather service SMHI operates a meteorological station at Landsort. The southern end of the island has either an oceanic climate (Cfb) or a humid continental climate (Dfb)(depending on if the 0 °C or -3 °C isotherm is used) with several maritime features. One of those is the delayed summer (May and June are very cool compared to nearby mainland areas), called seasonal lag. There is a very low diurnal temperature variation, which often results in very mild nights year-round compared with nearby cities and towns. Winters are more prone to cold than summers are to heat, owing to the possibility of coastal ice eliminating maritime moderation in winter months when inland temperatures are colder. During months in which ice is not a risk, all-time lows are much milder than during adjacent months. These cold snaps are rare. The area has a distinct microclimate, with relatively low precipitation for the reference period of 1961–1990. In spite of it being an extreme maritime climate by Swedish standards, it still is quite continental compared to similar latitudes in Scotland.

In summer, Landsort is isolated from heat waves affecting the east coast, with temperatures rarely going above . Between 2002 and 2016 there were only 14 such occurrences, at a 0.9 days average. The chilly temperatures are especially marked by May temperatures often staying 10 degrees lower or more than during coastal or inland warm periods. Summers are rather short, with June being relatively chilly and rapid cooling starting from September onwards. In spite of the cool summer days, Landsort has never reported September frost, a very unusual occurrence for Swedish weather stations. Overnight lows can be extremely mild. During a late summer 2002 heat wave, Landsort did not fall below  the entire August. On the other extreme, during a 2006 heat wave affecting the entire southern mainland, Landsort never rose above  in spite of frequent hot days in its vicinity.

See also

 List of lighthouses and lightvessels in Sweden

References

External links
 
 Sjofartsverket  
 The Swedish Lighthouse Society 

Islands of Nynäshamn Municipality
Islands of the Stockholm archipelago
Lighthouses in Sweden
Villages in Sweden
1651 establishments in Sweden